Guerzoni is a surname. Notable people with the surname include:

Fausto Guerzoni (1904–1967), Italian film actor
 (1835–1886), Italian playwright
Luciano Guerzoni (1935–2017), Italian politician
Luciano Guerzoni (1938–2020), Italian politician